Matthias Müller (born 12 September 1982) is a Swiss orienteering competitor.

He participated in the 2009 World Orienteering Championships in Miskolc, where he placed 7th in the Sprint and 4th in the Middle Distance events.

He won a gold medal in the Relay with the Swiss team at the 2010 European Orienteering Championships in Primorsko. He won the Sprint Distance at the 2010 World Orienteering Championships in Trondheim, and the Bronze medal in the Relay competition together with Daniel Hubmann and Matthias Merz.

References

External links

1982 births
Living people
Swiss orienteers
Male orienteers
Foot orienteers
World Orienteering Championships medalists
Competitors at the 2009 World Games